The Bird Seller may refer to:

 Der Vogelhändler, an operetta by Carl Zeller
 The Bird Seller (1935 film), a German musical comedy film
 The Bird Seller (1953 film), a West German musical film
 The Bird Seller (1962 film), a West German musical comedy film